Lancelot Bangor Ward (14 September 1883 — 12 July 1959) was an English first-class cricketer and an officer in the Indian Civil Service.

The son of William Erskine Ward, he was born in British India at Shillong in September 1883. He was educated in England at Marlborough College, before matriculating to Trinity College, Cambridge. After graduating from Cambridge, he joined the Indian Civil Service in June 1905. Ward held a number of positions within the civil service with the Indian Finance Department, holding the position of accountant-general for the Central Provinces and Berar by April 1926. While in India, he made two appearances in first-class cricket for the Europeans cricket team in September 1910, against the Parsees and the Hindus. He scored 7 runs in his two matches, in addition to taking 2 wickets. Ward later returned to the United Kingdom, where he died in Wales at Cardigan in July 1959. His uncle, Edward Wolstenholme Ward, was also a first-class cricketer.

References

External links

1883 births
1959 deaths
People from Shillong
People educated at Marlborough College
Alumni of Trinity College, Cambridge
Indian Civil Service (British India) officers
English cricketers
Europeans cricketers
British people in colonial India